

Strongylium is a genus of darkling beetles in the family Tenebrionidae. It is one of the largest genera in the family and its subfamily Stenochiinae, with more than 1,400 known species which occur widely in the tropics and subtropics of the Old and New World. More than 300 species are native to the neotropics.

Gallery

See also
 List of Strongylium species

References

Further reading

External links

 

Tenebrionoidea